Zajonc or Zayonc is a surname. It is a spelling variant of Zając, meaning "hare" in Polish. Notable people with the surname include:
 Arthur Zajonc (born 1949), professor of physics at Amherst College in Massachusetts
 Miroslav Zajonc or Miro Zayonc (born 1960), Czechoslovak-born luger
 Rick Zayonc (born 1959), Canadian water polo player
 Robert Zajonc (1923–2008), Polish-born American social psychologist

See also
 
 
 32294 Zajonc, a main belt asteroid

Polish-language surnames
Surnames from nicknames